Michael Wittlich (also Mihkel Vitsut; 11 October 1866 – 6 February 1933) was an Estonian chemist and professor.

In 1890 he graduated from Riga Polytechnical Institute. From 1909 to 1918 he taught at Riga Polytechnical Institute, and from 1919 to 1932 at Tartu University.

In 1925 (with Paul Kogermann) he established the oil shale laboratory at Tartu University. He researched also the chemical structure of peat, technologies related to sugar and starch industries.

Works

1927: Valitud peatükid tehnoloogiast. Tartu [first Estonian-language textbook about chemical technology]

References

1866 births
1933 deaths
Estonian chemists